Kung Fu San Soo (功夫散手) is a Chinese-American martial art. It is based on techniques from all over China, both Northern and Southern Chinese martial arts systems. [Concentrated version of Choy Li Fut kung fu using most effective techniques.]

Etymology
The specific or proper name of this art is Tsoi Li Ho Fut Hung (蔡李何佛雄) and/or 5 Family Fist (五家拳). The name "Kung Fu San Soo" itself was chosen by Woo to simplify the pronunciation and meaning for American students, rather than using the complete names of the 5 families.

San Soo is a distinct fighting style from the similarly named Chinese martial art Sanda (also called Sanshou).  Although they share the same name in Chinese (散手 - meaning 'free hand'), context is used to differentiate between the two.

History
Kung Fu San Soo has its origins from the 5 Family Fist (五家拳), commonly practiced in the Taishan region of the Guangdong province. In China, many centuries ago, there were three original families that contributed information from their systems in order to create this art.  They built a monastery and developed a combined defense system.  These families are Tsoi, Li, and Ho.  Fut was the philosophical or religious base and originally made reference to Buddha.  The Hung family was added later in order to increase power, physical conditioning and dynamics.

The Japanese killed numerous martial artists pre-World War II, and during the war. Many fighters that were unfortunate enough to live in an area that the Japanese were occupying were killed because they were seen as a threat, and a possible leader for organizing resistance movements.

Then after the Cultural Revolution and the Communists took over, history repeated itself. The Communists killed anyone who they perceived as a threat. Teachers, doctors, scientists, and Kung-Fu practitioners. Again, anyone who might organize a resistance movement.

During the 1960s, in an effort to revive the Kung-Fu martial arts in China, the government looked to any and all remaining Kung-Fu practitioners in Mainland China. They took what was useful, as well as any techniques from foreign martial arts they thought were useful, and made the Chinese Red Army San Shou (散手). This was only taught to the Army, and to the Police Forces.

Foundation and techniques
Kung Fu San Soo originated for use in military combat and uses techniques designed to swiftly disable an attacker.  Due to the fact San Soo is a practical martial art for self-defense and the techniques are intended for real fight scenarios, there are no competitions or tournaments for San Soo Kung Fu. While San Soo was not created or taught as a tournament sport, practitioners commonly incorporate forms of limited sparring.

Kung Fu San Soo does not attempt to emulate the motions of animals with elaborate forms. His words were, "We fight like men, not animals."

The basic premise of San Soo is there are no rules in a fight, so the style is techniques oriented to remove a threat as quickly as possible through seizing the initiative and keeping the opponent off balance.  Like many martial arts, San Soo can be used by smaller or weaker persons against larger or stronger assailants by utilizing technique and knowledge of reaction to make up for a lack of strength.

Techniques in San Soo are made up of Chin Na leverages, throwing, choking, joint-locking, strangling, strikes, and quick takedowns.  Targets include the eyes, nose, throat, base of the skull, neck, liver, spleen, kidneys, testicles, and knees, and for this reason, most San Soo practitioners do not engage in full contact competition/sport fighting.  Techniques are commonly practiced in unrehearsed 'freestyle workout' sessions with carefully controlled contact. San Soo practitioners claim this method of training builds an automatic and flexible response in much the same way we learn language a few words at a time until we have full and versatile vocabularies. Training methods, historic interpretations, and modifications exist from school to school among the modern descendants of San Soo.

San Soo also incorporates training with the use of many traditional Chinese weapons.  These include the staff (5', 7' and 9'), broadsword, hooking or ripping swords, baat cham do (butterfly swords), three-section staff, tai-chi sword, knife, spear, kwon do, chas and chain.  The baton, although not a traditional Chinese weapon, was a weapon that Jimmy Woo specialized in and incorporated into the art.

Notable practitioners

Jimmy H. Woo (founder of American Kung Fu San Soo) 
Kung Fu San Soo was brought to United States by Chin Siu Dek. Kung Fu San Soo tradition holds that Chin Siu Dek lived and grew up just across the river from this school in the village of Sanba. Chin learnt Five Family Style / Tsoi Li Ho Fut Hung primarily from his Great-Uncle, Chan Siu Hung  at the Hung Sing Goon school in Taishan, Guangdong Province, China. The Hung Sing Goon school would end up being destroyed by communist partisans during the Cultural Revolution.

Chin would enter United States under the Chinese Exclusion Act, and leaving China on the eve of the Japanese Occupation, Chin Siu Dek took the name, "Jimmy Haw Woo" as a lifetime pseudonym.

Most believe he was born around 1905–10. Jimmy H. Woo died in Southern California on February 14, 1991,

Benjamin Brandt
Benjamin Brandt was a first-generation master trained by Jimmy Woo at studios in La Habra, CA and Monterey Park, CA. Ben Brandt is the incorporator of the International Kung Fu San Soo Association, established on September 15, 1983 in Monterey Park, CA.

Kathy Long
Kathy Long is 5-time World Champion Kickboxer and holds an 8th degree black belt/sash in Kung Fu San Soo.

Gerald Okamura
Gerald Okamura is a Hollywood Actor and Stuntman

Ralph Johnson
Ralph Johnson is the drummer for Earth, Wind & Fire

Daniele Bolelli
Daniele Bolelli is author of multiple books and creator of the History on Fire podcast. He holds an 8th Degree Black Belt in Kung Fu San Soo

See also
 Jeet Kune Do
 Choy Li Fut
 Vovinam
 Nanquan (martial art)
 Kajukenbo

Notes

References

External links 
History, Lineage, and San Soo sections of Sonora San Soo
Reeder's Kung Fu San Soo School
Sudden Violence: The Art Of San Soo Greg Jones

Chinese martial arts
Hybrid martial arts
North American martial arts
Martial arts in the United States